The AAAW Tag Team Championship is a women's professional wrestling championship formerly contested in the Japanese women's professional wrestling promotion Gaea Japan. The title which was originally known as the AAAW Junior Heavyweight Tag Team Championship before weight classes were dropped in 1998, was abandoned when GAEA closed in 2005. It was revived in May 2022 and began being sanctioned by Marvelous That's Women Pro Wrestling ever since.

Title history

Names

Reigns

Combined reigns 

By team

By wrestler

References

External links
GAEA Japan AAAW Tag Team Championship history

Women's professional wrestling tag team championships
Gaea Japan championships